Juan Antonio Rodríguez-Aransay (born 5 May 1962) is a former professional tennis player from Spain.

Biography
Born in Madrid, Rodríguez began on the professional tour in 1982. 

He twice made the second round of Grand Prix tournaments and on both occasions was beaten by the number one seed. At the 1985 Stockholm Open he progressed when France's Henri Leconte retired hurt with the Spaniard two games from victory, then was beaten in the second round by John McEnroe. He lost to Stefan Edberg in the second round of the 1986 Swedish Open, having earlier defeated Craig Campbell.

His best performance on the Grand Prix circuit in doubles came at the 1986 Athens Open, where he and José Clavet reached the semi-finals.

At Challenger level he won one title, at Hanko, Finland in 1986, which he secured with a win over world number 55 Jan Gunnarsson in the final.

Nowadays he is a tennis teacher in the Real Grupo de Cultura Covadonga's club in Gijón, Asturias.

Challenger titles

Singles: (1)

References

External links
 
 

1962 births
Living people
Spanish male tennis players
Tennis players from Madrid